Donna J. Schafer (born April 12, 1934) is an American former politician. She served in the South Dakota House of Representatives from 2001 to 2006.

References

1934 births
Living people
People from Vermillion, South Dakota
Educators from South Dakota
American women educators
Women state legislators in South Dakota
Republican Party members of the South Dakota House of Representatives
21st-century American politicians
21st-century American women politicians